Lambingan is a 1940 Filipino film directed by Lorenzo P. Tuells. It stars Rosa Aguirre, Rogelio de la Rosa and Carmen Rosales.

External links
 

1940 films
Tagalog-language films
Sampaguita Pictures films
Philippine black-and-white films
Philippine musical drama films
1940s musical drama films
1940 drama films